Taybat al-Imam (also spelled Tayyibat al-Imam or Taibet el-Imam) is a town in northern Syria, administratively part of the Hama Governorate, located 18 kilometers northwest of Hama. Nearby localities include Halfaya and Mhardeh to the west, Lataminah to the northwest, Mork to the north, Suran to the east, Maar Shahhur to the southeast, Qamhana to the south and Khitab to the southwest. According to the Syria Central Bureau of Statistics (CBS), Taybat al-Imam had a population of 24,105 in the 2004 census. Its inhabitants are predominantly Sunni Muslims.

Church of the Holy Martyrs

Taybat al-Imam contains the Byzantine-era Church of the Holy Martyrs that dates back to 442 CE. The church, which now serves as a museum in the center of town, consists of three naves and contains a large mosaic covering the building's entire floor. The mosaic was accidentally discovered in 1985 during road construction in the town. Between that year and 1987 it was excavated by the Jordan-based Franciscan Archaeological Institute. The mosaic is noted for both its size and for its depiction of 20 different building types, including religious and civil structures. Other images depicted include the scene of Paradise, the Tigris and Euphrates rivers, the churches of Jerusalem and Bethlehem, the basilica of St. Simeon Stylites and the double towers of Qalb Lozeh, both sites in northern Syria near Aleppo.

Syrian civil war
As part of the ongoing Syrian civil war, Taybat al-Imam was the scene of violent clashes between the rebel Free Syrian Army and the government's armed forces in December 2012. The clashes were part of a rebel offensive into Hama Governorate.In August 2016, rebels manages to recapture the city.
On 20 April 2017, Syrian Army recaptured the city from jihadist rebels.

See also
 Michele Piccirillo (1944–2008), Franciscan archaeologist involved in building a shelter over the Byzantine church ruins

References

Bibliography

 

Populated places in Hama District
Towns in Hama Governorate